William Kwasi Aboah (born 4 June 1939) is a Ghanaian barrister and politician. He was the minister for the police and the former minister for interior of Ghana.

Early life and education
Aboah was born on 4 June 1939. He attended the Larteh Presby Boarding School between 1951 and 1954. He attended the Police Training Depot, passing out as a constable. While working, he took other courses at the Accra Workers College between 1965 and 1970. He attended the Police College in 1977, qualifying as an Assistant Superintendent of Police. He studied law at the University of Ghana between 1978 and 1981, graduating with the LL.B. degree. He continued to the Ghana School of Law, qualifying as a Barrister-at-Law. He studied for the master's degree in law at the University College London.

Career
Aboah began his career as a police constable. He later worked as a detective inspector. He rose to the rank of inspector in the Police, working at the Criminal Investigation Department (CID). He held various posts within the Ghana Police, becoming commander of the Ashanti Region Police. He was seconded to the Ghana immigration service where he served as the director. He became head of the CID in August 1999.

Aboah was appointed by President John Atta Mills as the minister for interior following a cabinet reshuffle in January 2012 and was succeeded by Kwesi Ahwoi in February 2013.

Honour 
He was awarded the Sword of Honour presented by the Head of State for being all rounds Best Cadet Officer in 1977.

References

External links and sources
CV on MyJoyOnline

1939 births
Living people
University of Ghana alumni
Alumni of University College London
Interior ministers of Ghana
National Democratic Congress (Ghana) politicians
Ghana School of Law alumni
Ghanaian expatriates in England
William
2017 deaths